Ángeles Paúl Vélez Ordoñez (born 12 May 1971) is an Ecuadorian football manager and former player who played as a defender. He is the current manager of Libertad FC.

Playing career
Born in Cuenca, Vélez played only in local sides during his entire career. He represented Cruz del Vado, LDU Cuenca and Deportivo Cuenca, and retired in 1994, aged just 23.

Managerial career
After retiring, Vélez returned to Deportivo Cuenca in 1998, to work as an assistant manager of the under-15 and later the under-20 squads. He was an assistant of the main squad in 2000, and subsequently worked as an under-16 and under-18 manager from 2001 to 2003.

Vélez was in charge of the under-17s in 2004, of the under-18s in 2005 and of the under-19s in 2006. In 2007, he became Gabriel Perrone's assistant in the main squad, and became an interim manager in October 2008, after Perrone left, and qualified the club for the 2009 Copa Libertadores.

Vélez returned to an assistant role for the 2009 campaign after Cuenca signed Guillermo Duró. In September of that year, he was again named manager after Duró resigned.

On 22 June 2010, despite finishing second in the previous tournament and again qualifying to the Libertadores, Vélez resigned. He took over Serie B side Técnico Universitario in July, leading the club to a top tier promotion before being sacked on 5 November 2011.

In December 2011, Vélez took over LDU Loja, but was relieved of his duties in May 2013. He returned to Técnico Universitario back in the second division on 2 July 2013, and narrowly missed out promotion in the 2014 season.

On 22 December 2014, Vélez returned to Deportivo Cuenca as their manager. He left the club the following 7 April due to poor results, he took over Deportivo Quito on 27 May, but left on a mutual agreement on 24 August.

Vélez was named in charge of second-level side Macará on 20 January 2016, and achieved promotion as champions in his first season. He subsequently qualified the club for two Copa Libertadores (2017 and 2019) and two Copa Sudamericana (2018 and 2020), while also being the best ranked club in the 2019 campaign.

On 28 December 2020, Vélez was presented as manager of Delfín. He left the club on mutual agreement on 31 July 2021, and was subsequently appointed for a second spell at Macará on 5 August.

Vélez was sacked by Macará on 1 August 2022. On 22 September, he was announced as manager of Libertad FC, and helped in their first-ever promotion to the top tier.

References

External links

1971 births
Living people
People from Cuenca, Ecuador
Ecuadorian footballers
Association football defenders
C.D. Cuenca footballers
Ecuadorian football managers
C.D. Cuenca managers
L.D.U. Loja managers
S.D. Quito managers
C.S.D. Macará managers
Delfín S.C. managers
Libertad F.C. (Ecuador) managers